Cycloneda is a genus of spotless lady beetles in the family Coccinellidae. There are more than 20 described species in Cycloneda.

Species
These 27 species belong to the genus Cycloneda:

 Cycloneda ancoralis Germar
 Cycloneda andresi Oroz, Bustamante & Cosio, 2009
 Cycloneda atra Casey
 Cycloneda boliviana Mulsant
 Cycloneda costaricae Chapin
 Cycloneda delauneyi (Fleutiaux & Sallé, 1889)
 Cycloneda dilychnis Mulsant, 1850
 Cycloneda disconsolata Vandenberg & Gonzalez
 Cycloneda emarginata
 Cycloneda eryngii Mulsant
 Cycloneda germainii Crotch
 Cycloneda hondurasica Casey
 Cycloneda lacrimosa Gonzalez & Vandenberg
 Cycloneda limbifer Casey, 1899
 Cycloneda lueri González, Bustamante & Oroz, 2008
 Cycloneda maeander Mulsant, 1850
 Cycloneda marcapatae Bustamante, Oroz & Cosio, 2009
 Cycloneda munda (Say, 1835) (polished lady beetle)
 Cycloneda patagonica Gonzalez & Vandenberg
 Cycloneda polita Casey, 1899 (western blood-red lady beetle)
 Cycloneda pretiosa Vandenberg & Gonzalez
 Cycloneda puncticollis Mulsant, 1850
 Cycloneda rubida (Mulsant, 1850)
 Cycloneda rubripennis Casey
 Cycloneda sanguinea (Linnaeus, 1763) (spotless lady beetle)
 Cycloneda sicardi Brethes
 Cycloneda vandenbergae González, Bustamante & Oroz, 2008

References

Further reading

External links

 

Coccinellidae
Coccinellidae genera
Articles created by Qbugbot